You and Me is a 1975 American film directed by David Carradine in his directorial debut and starring Carradine, Bobbi Shaw, Barbara Hershey, and Gary Busey as well as Carradine's brothers Keith Carradine and Robert Carradine.

Premise
A young boy and a biker become best friends on the road.

Production
The film was shot in the summer of 1972 but was not released until three years later. It had a budget of $63,000. Carradine called it "part motorcycle movie part Walt Disney part its own thing".

The title song of the movie, composed and sung by David Carradine, was released as a single record around 1973, and as part of Carradine's first album Grasshopper in 1975.

References

External links

You and Me at TCMDB

1975 films
American drama road movies
1975 drama films
1970s English-language films
Films directed by David Carradine
1975 directorial debut films
1970s American films